The Washington Community School District, or Washington Community Schools, is a rural public school district based in Washington, Iowa.  The district is mainly in Washington County, with a small area in Jefferson County, and serves the towns of Washington and Brighton, and surrounding rural areas.

The school's mascot is the Demons. Their colors are orange and black.

Schools
The district operates four schools, all in Washington:
Stewart Elementary School
Lincoln Upper Elementary School
Washington Middle School
Washington High School

See also
List of school districts in Iowa

References

External links
 Washington Community School District

Education in Washington County, Iowa
Education in Jefferson County, Iowa
School districts in Iowa